Lamont Alexander "Monty" Hamilton (born April 6, 1984) is an American professional basketball player for Niigata Albirex BB of the Japanese B.League. He is a 6'10" (2.08 m) tall power forward-center.

College career
Hamilton played four years of college basketball at St. John's University, where he played with the St. John's Red Storm, from 2003 to 2007. He was named to the All-Big East Conference First Team in 2007.

Professional career
Hamilton began his pro career in 2007 with Basquet Inca of the Spanish 2nd Division. In 2008, he moved to the Spanish 2nd Division club Tenerife. In 2009, he joined the French League club Paris-Levallois.

In July 2012, he signed a one-year deal with the Spanish club Bilbao Basket. With Bilbao, he was named to the European 2nd-tier competition EuroCup's All-EuroCup Second Team in 2013.

In June 2013, he signed a two-year deal with the Spanish club Laboral Kutxa. He left the Basque team in December 2014, after playing 47 games and missing 39 due to injuries. On December 31, 2014, he signed with Krasny Oktyabr of Russia for the rest of the season.

On July 22, 2015, he signed a one-year deal with Beşiktaş.

On August 20, 2016, he signed with Ryukyu Golden Kings of the Japanese B.League.

EuroLeague career statistics

|-
| style="text-align:left;"| 2013–14
| style="text-align:left;"| Baskonia
| 12 || 1 || 26.3 || .412 || .452 || .658 || 3.6 || 1.3 || 1.1 || .9 || 10.3 || 10.3
|-
| style="text-align:left;"| 2014–15
| style="text-align:left;"| Baskonia
| 4 || 0 || 15.4 || .318 || .125 || .500 || 1.8 || 1.0 || 0.0 || 1.0 || 4.0 || 1.8
|- class="sortbottom"
| style="text-align:left;"| Career
| style="text-align:left;"|
| 16 || 1 || 17.9 || .395 || .384 || .650 || 3.1 || 1.3 || .8 || .9 || 8.7 || 8.2
|}

Japanese league career statistics 

|-
| align="left" | 2016–17
| align="left" | Ryukyu Kings
|60 ||39 || 23.0 ||.428  || .289 ||.727 || 6.8 || 3.0 || .7 ||1.0  || 11.7
|-
| align="left" | 2017–18
| align="left" | Niigata
|30 ||16 || 22.8 ||.454  || .336 ||.620 || 5.7 || 1.2 || .5 ||1.0  || 13.3
|-

Awards and achievements

College
All-Big East Conference First Team: (2007)

Pro career
French League All-Star: (2012)
All-EuroCup Second Team: (2013)

References

External links
 NBA.com Profile
 Euroleague.net Profile
 FIBA.com Profile
 Eurobasket.com Profile
 Spanish League Profile 
 NBADraft.net Profile
 Draftexpress.com Profile
 St. John's College Bio
 College Stats

1984 births
Living people
American expatriate basketball people in France
American expatriate basketball people in Japan
American expatriate basketball people in Russia
American expatriate basketball people in Spain
American expatriate basketball people in Turkey
American men's basketball players
Basketball players from New York City
BC Krasny Oktyabr players
Beşiktaş men's basketball players
Bilbao Basket players
CB Inca players
Centers (basketball)
Liga ACB players
Niigata Albirex BB players
Metropolitans 92 players
Power forwards (basketball)
Ryukyu Golden Kings players
Saski Baskonia players
Sportspeople from Brooklyn
St. John's Red Storm men's basketball players
Tenerife CB players